This list of Nobel laureates affiliated with Princeton University as alumni or faculty comprehensively shows alumni (graduates and attendees) or faculty members (professors of various ranks, researchers, and visiting lecturers or professors) affiliated with Princeton University who were awarded the Nobel Prize or the Nobel Memorial Prize in Economic Sciences. People who have given public lectures, talks or non-curricular seminars; studied as non-degree students; received honorary degrees; or served as administrative staff at the university are excluded from the list. Summer school attendees and visitors are generally excluded from the list, since summer terms are not part of formal academic years.

The Nobel Prizes are awarded annually by the Royal Swedish Academy of Sciences, the Karolinska Institute, and the Norwegian Nobel Committee to individuals who make outstanding contributions in the fields of chemistry, physics, literature, peace, and physiology or medicine. They were established by the 1895 will of Alfred Nobel, which dictates that the awards should be administered by the Nobel Foundation. Another prize, the "Sveriges Riksbank Prize in Economic Sciences in Memory of Alfred Nobel" (commonly known as the Nobel Economics Prize), was established in 1968 (first awarded in 1969) by the Sveriges Riksbank, the central bank of Sweden, for contributors to the field of economics.

As of October 2021, 76 Nobel laureates have been affiliated with Princeton University as alumni or faculty. Among the 76 laureates, 43 are Nobel laureates in natural sciences; 22 are Princeton alumni (graduates and attendees) and 29 have been long-term faculty members of the Princeton faculty; and subject-wise, 29 laureates have won the Nobel Prize in Physics, more than any other subject. In 2021, Princeton scholars and alumni received an unprecedented five Nobel Prizes.

Woodrow Wilson, the former president of Princeton University, was the first Princeton alumni to win the Nobel Prize, winning the Nobel Peace Prize in 1919. Five Nobel Prizes (same subject in the same year) were shared by Princeton laureates: James Cronin and Val Logsdon Fitch won the 1980 Nobel Prize in Physics; Russell Alan Hulse and Joseph Hooton Taylor, Jr. won the 1993 Nobel Prize in Physics; David Gross and Frank Wilczek won the 2004 Nobel Prize in Physics; Thomas Sargent and Christopher Sims won the 2011 Nobel Memorial Prize in Economics; and David Card and Joshua Angrist won the 2021 Nobel Memorial Prize in Economics. John Bardeen received two Nobel Prizes in Physics, in 1956 and in 1972; since this is a list of laureates, not prizes, he is counted only once.

Summary
All types of affiliations, namely alumni and faculty members, count equally in the following table and throughout the whole page.

In the following list, the number following a person's name is the year they received the prize; in particular, a number with asterisk (*) means the person received the award while they were working at Princeton University (including emeritus staff). A name underlined implies that this person has already been listed in a previous category (i.e., multiple affiliations).

Nobel laureates by category

Nobel laureates in Physics

Nobel laureates in Chemistry

Nobel laureates in Physiology or Medicine

Nobel Memorial Prize laureates in Economics

Nobel laureates in Literature

Nobel Peace Prize laureates

See also
 List of Princeton University people
 List of Nobel laureates by university affiliation

Notes

References

External links
Honors & Awards

Princeton University
Nobel